Giorgio Baglivi (September 8, 1668 – June 15, 1707), born  and sometimes anglicized as  was a Croatian-Italian physician and scientist. He made important contributions to clinical education, based on his own medical practice. His De Fibra Motrice advanced the "solidist" theory that the solid parts of organs are more crucial to their good functioning than their fluids, against the traditional belief in four humors. Baglivi, however, advocated against doctors relying on any general theory rather than careful observation. He was "a distinguished physiological researcher fascinated by the nerves, his microscopic studies enabled him to distinguish between smooth and striated muscles and distinct kinds of fibres."

Life
Giorgio was born to Blasius Armeno and Anna de Lupis on September 8, 1668, in Ragusa (now Dubrovnik, Croatia). His mother was Croatian, while his father was possibly of Armenian descent His parents were respectable but poor merchants who both died in 1670, after the birth of Giorgio's younger brother Jacob. The brothers were originally raised by their uncle and educated at Ragusa's Jesuit college.

At 15, the brothers moved to Lecce in Apulia, where they took the name of his adoptive father, a wealthy physician named Pietro Angelo Baglivi. Giorgio studied first at the universities of Salerno, then successively at Padua and Bologna and possibly also Naples. He attended Lorenzo Bellini's lectures in Pisa and worked in hospitals in Padua and Venice, Florence, and Bologna and travelled to the Dutch Republic and England from 1688 to 1692. As early as 1685, Baglivi began experimenting with animals, injecting different substances into dogs' jugular veins and examining the life cycle of tarantulas. Between 1689 and 1691, he performed many autopsies and dissected animals including lions, deer, tortoises, and snakes. He studied dura mater through observing injured men and experimenting on dogs and also investigated toxic drugs. Observing discrepancies between his research and clinical practice, he criticized doctors for following theoretical systems slavishly instead of relying more strongly on observation. (This would later be the central theme of his 1696 book On Medical Practice.)

He served as an assistant to Marcello Malpighi in Bologna in 1691, and followed him to Rome the next year when Malpighi was named chief personal physician ("archiater") to the pope. Under Malpighi, Baglivi performed experiments on the circulation of blood in frogs; he also injected various medicines into dogs' veins and spinal canals and experimented on their pneumogastric nerves. He utilized a microscope to study the structure of muscles and the brain. Following Malpighi's death in 1694, Baglivi performed his autopsy and gave a thorough description of the cerebral apoplexy that killed him. While in Rome, he befriended Bellini, Lancisi, Redi, Tozzi, and Trionfetti. In 1695, he became second physician to Pope  and, in 1696, was elected professor of anatomy at the College of Sapienza. He received memberships in Rome's Academy of the Arcadians (1699) and the Tuscan Fisiocriti (1700). He continued his observations by microscope as professor of theoretical medicine at the Sapienza, as well as examining the properties of saliva, bile, and blood. His lectures, demonstrations, and consultations became famed across Europe: he was elected a Fellow of the Royal Society in England in July 1698, a member of the Holy Roman Empire's Academy of the Curious in 1699, and an "honorary member" of the French Academy. For a time he was surrounded in controversy following charges of plagiarism by Antonio Pacchioni, but Baglivi successfully defended the primacy of his own work.

He died in Rome on June 15, 1707.

Works
Baglivi's writings bear strong similarities to Santorio Santorio and defend biomechanicism, making him one of the iatrophysicists. Being inclined towards mathematics and quantification in medicine, Baglivi viewed the physiological processes in mechanical terms, behaving like the parts of a machine. A collection of his Latin writings were published in quarto in 1704. Subsequently, his collected works were reprinted in more than 20 editions (including an octavo edition in 1788) and were translated into Italian, French, German, and English. His personal correspondence in Latin and Italian is held at the National Central Library in Florence, Italy; the Waller Collection at the university library in Uppsala, Sweden; and at McGill University's Osler Library in Montreal, Quebec, Canada.

 De praxi medica ad priscam observandi rationem ravocanda (Rome, 1696; trans. as The Practice of Physick at London, 1704)
 De fibra motrice, et morbosa, nec non de experimentis, ac morbis salivae, bilis, et sanguinis (Perugia, 1700)
 Specimen quatuor libroum de fibra motrice et morbosa (Rome, 1702) 
 Canones de medicina solidorum ad rectum statices usum (Rome, 1704) 
 Opera omnia medico-practica et anatomica (Lyons, 1704; new enlarged ed., 1710; ed. by C.G. Kuhn at Leipzig, 1827-1828)

See also
 List of Italians and notable Ragusans
 Dubrovnik
 Dalmatia

Notes

References

Citations

Bibliography

 .
 .
 .
 .
 .
 A. Toscano, Une leçon d’histoire de la médecine: Giorgio Baglivi, un médecin entre Italie, Arménie et Croatie, in "Scienze e Ricerche" , n. 40, 1° novembre 2016, ISSN: 2283-5873, pp. 10–17, https://www.academia.edu/29542864/Une_le%C3%A7on_d_histoire_de_la_m%C3%A9decine_Giorgio_Baglivi_un_m%C3%A9decin_entre_Italie_Arm%C3%A9nie_et_Croatie_in_Scienze_e_Ricerche_n_40_1_novembre_2016_ISSN_2283_5873_pp_10_17
 A. Toscano, Giorgio Baglivi. The Italian Work of an Armenian Physician born in Croatia, in "Scienze e Ricerche", n. 15, 15 ottobre 2015, pp 43–53, ISSN 2283-5873, https://web.archive.org/web/20160506164611/http://www.scienze-ricerche.it/?page_id=5260
 A. Toscano, Catalogo delle carte di Giorgio Baglivi conservato nella Waller Samling presso Universitetsbiblioteket "Carolina Rediviva" di Uppsala, in "Nuncius", Anno IX (1994), fasc.2, 1994
 A. Toscano (ed.), Giorgio Baglivi, Carteggio (1679-1704). Conservato nella Waller Collection presso la University Library “Carolina Rediviva” di Uppsala, “Archivio della Corrispondenza degli Scienziati Italiani” ): Leo S. Olschki, Firenze 1999
 A. Toscano, Giorgio Baglivi e la Comunità scientifica europea tra razionalismo e illuminismo, in Atti del Convegno: Alle origini della biologia medica. Giorgio Baglivi tra le due sponde dell’Adriatico, in “Medicina nei secoli”, n.s., vol. 12, n. 1 (2000), p. 49-79
 A. Toscano, Mirabilis Machina. Il "perpetuum mobile" attraverso il 'De statice aeris' ed il ‘De fibra Motrice et Morbosa’ di Giorgio Baglivi, 2 voll., Edizioni Brenner, Cosenza 2004, 2013
 A. Toscano, ‘Il Movimento agente universale’. Il moto armonico del cosmo e la macchina dei fenomeni vitali: Giorgio Baglivi ed il ‘De statice aeris’, Anna Toscano-www.storiadellascienza.it, 2008,
 A. TOSCANO, Perpetuum Mobile. The ‘De Fibra Motrice et Morbosa ’and The ‘De Statice Aeris’ by Giorgio Baglivi in the European Scientific Community between Galileanism and Enlightenment. Collection of essays, Brenner Editore, Cosenza, 2013
 A. TOSCANO, “In natura non esiste nulla di più antico del moto”. Dal moto armonico del Cosmo alla meccanica dei fenomeni vitali: G. Baglivi ed il ‘De statice aeris’, lecture submitted to INTERNATIONAL SEMINAR -HISTORY OF MEDITERRANEAN MEDICINE – GIORGIO (ÐURO) BAGLIVI, DUBROVNIK 28–30 June 2007, organized by: University of Zagreb; Centre for Mediterranean Studies – Dubrovnik; History of Medicine and Health Institute - University of Geneva; Medical School - University of Zagreb, in A. TOSCANO, Perpetuum Mobile. The ‘De Fibra Motrice et Morbosa’ and The ‘De Statice Aeris’ by Giorgio Baglivi in the European Scientific Community between Galileanism and Enlightenment. Collection of essays, Brenner Editore, Cosenza, 2013
 A. TOSCANO, La storia, la geografia e i remedi nella medicina di Giorgio Baglivi tra il XVII ed il XVIII secolo, lecture submitted to  INTERNATIONAL COLLOQUIUM - THE HISTORY OF PATHOCOENOSIS OF THE MEDITERRANEAN AREA:DISEASES, ENVIRONMENT, CIVILIZATIONS- Dubrovnik, 3–5 May 2010, organized by: History of Medicine and Health Institute - University of Geneva, Centre for Mediterranean Studies – Dubrovnik, in A. TOSCANO, Perpetuum Mobile. The ‘De Fibra Motrice et Morbosa’ and The ‘De Statice Aeris’ by Giorgio Baglivi in the European Scientific Community between Galileanism and Enlightenment. Collection of essays, Brenner Editore, Cosenza, 2013 ;
 A. TOSCANO, La diffusione delle idee scientifiche dal Sud dell’Italia al Sud della France nel XVIII secolo: il pensireo medico di Giorgio Baglivi nella Facoltà di Medicina di Montpellier, lecture submitted to 126e Congrès des Sociétés historiques et scientifiques - Terres et hommes du Sud, Toulouse 9- 14 avril 2001, A. TOSCANO, Perpetuum Mobile. The ‘De Fibra Motrice et Morbosa’ and The ‘De Statice Aeris’ by Giorgio Baglivi in the European Scientific Community between Galileanism and Enlightenment. Collection of essays, Brenner Editore, Cosenza, 2013.

 .
 

1668 births
1707 deaths
People from Dubrovnik
Italian people of Armenian descent
Ethnic Armenian physicians
17th-century Italian physicians
18th-century Italian physicians
Fellows of the Royal Society